Langar (also Romanized as Lengar; also known as Kharjerd) is a village in Mian Jam Rural District, in the Central District of Torbat-e Jam County, Razavi Khorasan Province, Iran. At the 2006 census, its population was 769, in 167 families.

References 

Populated places in Torbat-e Jam County